The 2019 BMW PGA Championship was the 65th edition of the BMW PGA Championship, an annual golf tournament on the European Tour, held 19–22 September at the West Course of Wentworth Club in Virginia Water, Surrey, England, a suburb southwest of London.

Danny Willett, co-leader after three rounds with Jon Rahm, won by three strokes from Rahm with Christiaan Bezuidenhout in third place.

Course layout

Field

Past champions in the field

Made the cut

Missed the cut

Nationalities in the field

Round summaries

First round
Thursday, 19 September 2019

Second round
Friday, 20 September 2019

Play was suspended because of darkness with 5 players still to complete their second round. They completed their second round early on Saturday morning.

Third round
Saturday, 21 September 2019

Overnight co-leaders Jon Rahm and Danny Willett both scored 68 and they extended their lead over the rest of the field from two strokes to three. Three players were tied for third place: Christiaan Bezuidenhout and Justin Rose who both scored 69 while Shubhankar Sharma scored 66. Ross Fisher scored 66, finishing with an albatross 2 at the final hole, coming home in 29. Rory McIlroy scored 65, the best round of the day, but was still 9 strokes behind the leaders.

Final round
Sunday, 22 September 2019

References

External links
Coverage on European Tour official site
Wentworth Club: Golf

BMW PGA Championship
Golf tournaments in England
BMW PGA Championship
BMW PGA Championship
BMW PGA Championship